The Greek Seniors Open was an over-50s men's professional golf tournament on the European Seniors Tour that was played at Glyfada Golf Club of Athens, Glifada in Athens from 1999 to 2001. The 2001 event was won by Russell Weir, his only win on the Seniors Tour.

Winners

References

Former European Senior Tour events
Golf tournaments in Greece
Recurring sporting events established in 1999
Recurring sporting events disestablished in 2001
1999 establishments in Greece
2001 disestablishments in Greece